This is a list of known American football players who have played for the Orange Tornadoes of the National Football League. It includes players that have played at least one match with the team.



B
Ralph Barkman,
Bob Beattie,
Heinie Benkert

C
Bill Clarkin, 
Ernie Cuneo

D
Jack Depler,
Bob Dwyer

F
Bill Feaster

H
Steve Hamas,
Ernie Hambacker

J
Leon Johnson

K
Tex Kelly,
Tom Kerrigan, 
Frank Kirkleski

L
Paul Longua, 
John Lott,
Eddie Lynch

M
Jack McArthur,
Felix McCormick,
Ted Mitchell

N
Will Norman

P
George Pease

S
Andy Salata,
Phil Scott

T
Johnny Tomaini

V
Charlie Van Horn

W
Ray Wagner,
Carl Waite

References
Orange Tornadoes 1929 Roster

 
Orange